Fiorini may refer to:

Places
 Fiorini, village in Croatia

Surname 
 Brayden Fiorini (born 1997), Australian rules footballer
 Chiara Fiorini (born 1956), Swiss painter and object artist 
 Elisabetta Fiorini Mazzanti (1799–1879), Italian botanist
 Ettore Fiorini (born 1933), Italian experimental particle physicist
 Frank Fiorini (1924-1993), one of the five Watergate burglars during the presidency of Richard Nixon
 Giovanni Andrea Fiorini (1716-1778), Italian classical composer, maestro di cappella and organist 
 Giovanni Battista Fiorini, Italian painter of the late Renaissance period
 Giuseppe Fiorini (1861–1934), Italian luthier and violin maker
 Guido Fiorini (1897–1966), Italian engineer, architect and art director
 Gustavo Fiorini (born 1919), Italian professional football player
 Ippolito Fiorini (c. 1549–1621), Italian composer and lutenist, and the maestro di capella at the court of Alfonso II d'Este
 Lando Fiorini (1938–2017), Italian actor and singer
 Matteo Fiorini (born 1978), Sammarinese politician, Captain Regent from October 2011 to April 2012
 Olga Fiorini (born 1927), Italian businesswoman and educator
 Pietro Fiorini (1539- 1629), Italian architect 
 Raffaele Fiorini (1828–1898), Italian violin maker
 Silvia Fiorini (born 1969), Italian football midfielder

See also
 Fiorina (disambiguation)
 Fiorino (disambiguation)

Italian-language surnames